Tina Kim may refer to:

 Tina Kim (comedian), Korean-American stand-up comedian
 Tina Kim (art dealer), art dealer and gallery owner
Tina Kim Gallery